The Albanian local elections of 2023 will take place on 14 May 2023 in Albania.

Background 
In the 2019 Albanian local elections the Albanian opposition had boycotted the elections leading to the Socialists running uncontested in 31 municipalities, However Shkodër and Finiq remain lead by the opposition. As for the rest belonging to the Socialist Party. According to official figures, the turnout was 22.97% or 812,249 people. The opposition stated that, according to their calculations, only 534,528 people took part, which means that the turnout was 15.12%. The elections were declared as a farce by leader of the opposition Lulzim Basha at the time. Sali Berisha and Ilir Meta officially met on 26 October 2022 planning for the upcoming elections.  Both Meta and Berisha plan to had primaries in the alliance to select their candidates for each municipality. While the Socialist Party planed to run in the elections alone without any electoral alliance. However, since the Democratic Party is split between Alibeaj and Berisha it was uncertain who will carry the name of the party on the ballot. Belind Këlliçi announced he would be the candidate to challenge Erion Veliaj in Tirana as Berisha's candidate. While Alibeaj had not released his candidate for Tirana. On January 25, Berisha's agreement with Vangjel Dule was revealed, which municipalities were given to PBDNJ. The Municipalities that were given to the PBDNJ were Finiq, Dropulli and Himara. While Taulant Balla claimed that the Socialists do not need any sort of coalition it is still not official if the PS will run alone or with a coalition. Edi Rama had stated that his party had selected every candidate for every region besides Vlorë and Durrës.  Ilirjan Celibashi Commissioner of the Central Election Commission had stated that neither Enkelejd Alibeaj nor Sali Berisha have been allowed to register their candidates as the Democratic party of Albania. The deadline was on March 7. Which will cause the Democratic party not to be registered for the upcoming Local Elections.  While For Edi Rama the elections had as well come at a bad time due to the McGonigal scandal. Where it was suspected that Charles McGonigal and Rama had met on a handful of occasions which had been seen controversial currently due to McGonigal's connections with Russian Oligarch Oleg Deripaska. He was also separately indicted for allegedly accepting payments amounting to more than US$225,000 from former Albanian intelligence Agron Neza. On 3 March 2023 The Democratic Party of Albania was given to Enkelejd Alibeaj rumored that Rama had ordered the Albanian Court to hand it over to Alibeaj rather then Berisha. Originally the Tirana Courts had originally accepted Sali Berisha's appeal that recognized Berisha’s Assembly’s decisions on changes within the Democratic Party Statue.On 11 March 2023 Enkelejd Alibeaj was not allowed to regiester the Democratic Party by the CEC claiming that the due to deficiencies in the documentation. Documentation showed that Lulzim Basha was leader of the Party even though originally Basha had resigned In march of last year. However Basha never in any documentation had announced his resignation. Alibeaj had announced he would send the CEC to court. While besides the Democratic Party. Berisha’s candidates were not allowed to register as the Democratic Party but instead as Ilir Meta’s Party. Besides the opposition The Socialist party has been in an internal feuds whether to put new candidates or keep the incumbent’s of most places in Albania. On 15 March 2023 Members of Berisha's Democratic Party and Ilir Metas Freedom Party announced their coalition name would be called Bashkë Fitojmë (Together we win). It Would consist of the Unity for Human Rights, the Freedom Party, Demochristian Party, and Majority of the Democratic party of Albania.

Partial elections March 2022 
After the results of the 2019 elections on the President announced by-elections on March 6, 2022, as at the time there was no elected mayor in the six districts Vorë, Dibër, Shkodër, Lushnjë, Rrogozhine and Durrës. The candidates that had been elected in June 2019 in those communities could not take office because of criminal misconduct that had become known in the past or the candidate had died. 

The election did not help at a time for the Democratic Party, which was involved in internal power struggles. Former party leader Sali Berisha was expelled from the party he helped found by the party leadership, but had previously personally conducted a party congress in which the participants had deposed the party leadership of Lulzim Basha. In the partial elections in the six municipalities, a candidate from the Democratic Party and a Berisha candidate ran alongside a candidate from the Socialist Party. The Berisha loyalist candidates ran under the coalition name Shtëpia e Lirisë (House of Freedom). In all communities, the Shtëpia e Lirisë candidates received about significantly more votes than the official PD representatives in Shkodër, Berisha's candidate won. While in the rest of the districts were won by the Socialist party. 

However, in the three voting stations of Bruçaj, Ndrejaj and Palaj of Shkodër which small villages in the mountains, elections were not held due to bad weather from heavy snowfall causing power cuts which had resulted in no election results in the villages.

Parties and coalitions

Mayor Elections 
Every Mayor is up for election even the Mayors who won in the March Partial elections in 2022.

Council Seats 
Every Council seat is up for election.

References

Local elections
Albania
2023
May 2023 events in Europe